Pohled or Pohleď may refer to places in the Czech Republic:

Pohled (Havlíčkův Brod District), a municipality and village in the Vysočina Region
Pohleď, a municipality and village in the Vysočina Region
Pohled, a village and part of Mladoňovice (Chrudim District) in the Pardubice Region